A separatist is an advocate of a state of separation for a group of people from a larger group.

Separatist or separatists may also refer to:

 Separatist Crisis (Star Wars), a plot element of the film Star Wars Episode I: The Phantom Menace and sequels
 Separatist feminism, a form of radical feminism that focuses exclusively on women and girls
 Separatist Puritan, English Puritan who advocated complete separation from the Church of England
 See also Ecclesiastical separatism and English Dissenters (also known as "English Separatists")
 Separatists of Zoar, German religious dissenters who founded the city of Zoar, Ohio, US
 Advocates of separation of church and state
 Separatist (band), an Australian Christian metal band

See also
 Secession (disambiguation)